There are seven Roman roads (Voie romaine) in the Nord département in France.

Départementale 52
The Steen-straete, also called départementale 52 (RD52 or D52), is a road between Cassel and the sea. It was at a time a Roman road, north-south direction extending from Boëseghem, passing by Cassel to the sea. It now leads to Dunkirk. This road could have preceded the Romans.

It forms the villages limit between Ledringhem and Arnèke, between Zegerscappel and Esquelbecq and between Pitgam-Steene and Crochte.

Départementale 238
From Boëseghem to Cassel, the section is now départementale (RD 238 or D238).

Communauté de communes de la Voie romaine
There is a Communauté de communes in Nord département called Communauté de communes de la Voie romaine, gathering the villages of Boëseghem, Morbecque, Steenbecque and Thiennes.

References

Routes départementales in France
History of Nord (French department)
Roman roads in Gaul
Transport in Hauts-de-France